Workflow technology is a field of software products designed to improve the design of information systems. It involves use of workflow engine, also known as an orchestration engine, to execute models of processes.
The models can be edited by persons not experienced in programming (e.g. managers) using workflow editors.

See also
 Workflow
 Workflow engine
 Workflow management system
 Workflow application
 Bioinformatics workflow management system
 Scientific workflow system

References

External links